Yongala may refer to:

Queensland 
 SS Yongala, a ship lost off the coast  in 1911
 Yongala Lodge, a heritage-listed house in Townsville named after the ship

South Australia 
 Hundred of Yongala, a cadastral unit
 Yongala, South Australia, a town 
 District Council of Yongala, a former local government area